North Side High School  is one of the five public high schools in the city of Jackson, Tennessee and a part of the Jackson-Madison County School System. Within the state, the school is commonly known as Jackson North Side.

History

In 1943, what is now called the South Building was completed and North Side was formed with the consolidation of Huntersville, Pope, Fairview, Browns Church, and Spring Creek schools.  In 1972, the football stadium was completed. East High consolidated with North Side in 1970, and Beech Bluff in 1977.  In 1992, Jackson City and Madison County school systems were combined. In that year, the Tech Prep Center (middle building) was completed, and the following year the Fine Arts Building was completed.

List of individuals having served as Pincipal of North Side High School:

1944-1950: C. J. Huckaba
1950-1962: M. G. Anderson
1962-1986: Thurman Reynolds
1986-1992: O'Neal Henley
1992-1995: Clarence Boone
1995-1996: Dan Shaw
1996-2004: Lora Murchison (First female high school principal in Jackson-Madison County)
2004-2007: Mike Martin
2007-2008: Buddy White
2008-2012: Jan Watson
2012-2014: Ricky Catlett
2014–Present Jason Bridgeman

School mascot

The school mascot is the Indian. The school colors are blue and gold. The stadium is also known as "The Reservation", it is dedicated and named after long-time North Side coach, T.D. Reynolds.

Notable alumni

Casey Prather (born 1991), basketball player in the Israeli Basketball Premier League

References

External links
School Website
School Calendar

Educational institutions established in 1943
Public high schools in Tennessee
Schools in Madison County, Tennessee
Jackson, Tennessee
1943 establishments in Tennessee